Bagassosis, an interstitial lung disease, is a type of hypersensitivity pneumonitis attributed to exposure to moldy molasses or bagasse dust.

Signs and symptoms
Some symptoms and signs of Bagassosis include breathlessness, cough, haemoptysis, slight fever. Acute diffuse bronchiolitis may also occur. An xray may show mottling of lungs or a shadow.

Cause
Bagassosis has been shown to be due to a thermophilic actinomycetes for which the name thermoactinomycetes sacchari was suggested.

Prevention
The following are precautionary measures that can be taken to avoid the spread of bagassosis:

 Dust control-prevention /suppression of dust such as wet process, enclosed apparatus, exhaust ventilation etc. should be used 
 Personal protection- masks/ respirators
 Medical control- initial medical examination & periodical checkups of workers
 Bagasse control- keep moisture content above 20% and spray bagasse with 2% propionic acid

History
Bagassosis was first reported in India by Ganguly and Pal in 1955, in a cardboard manufacturing plant near Kolkata. India has a large cane sugar industry. The sugarcane fibre which, until recently, went to waste, is now utilised in the manufacture of cardboard, paper and rayon.

References

External links 

Hypersensitivity pneumonitis